The Institute of Lutheran Theology is a private Lutheran seminary in Brookings, South Dakota. It provides distance education online and at its campus in Brookings.

History
The Institute of Lutheran Theology was started in 2009 by conservatives in the Evangelical Lutheran Church in America (ELCA) affiliated with the WordAlone Network in order to train Lutheran clergy and other church workers.

The Institute of Lutheran Theology is not supported by a single synod or religious association, but several. These include the North American Lutheran Church, the Lutheran Congregations in Mission for Christ, the Canadian Association of Lutheran Congregations, and the Augsburg Lutheran Churches. Instead, it hires and serves people from several different Lutheran church bodies in the United States, some of which recently formed after separating from the Evangelical Lutheran Church in America and lack seminaries of their own.

Academics
The institution is accredited by the Association for Biblical Higher Education (ABHE). ILT operates as a school which grants certificates and degrees to students who complete their studies with the school. It does not ordain graduates; that is left to the synods and associations which accept their graduates.

Library
The library has 30,000 physical volumes and more through ebrary as well as access to several other academic databases.

Notable faculty
Robert Benne
Dennis Bielfeldt
John Eidsmoe
Paul Hinlicky
Jack Kilcrease
George Tsakiridis
Lucas V. Woodford (emeritus)

See also

Confessing Movement
Lutheran CORE
ReconcilingWorks

References

External links
 Official website

Lutheran seminaries
Seminaries and theological colleges in South Dakota
Lutheran buildings and structures in North America